Panzerschreck (lit. "tank fright", "tank's fright" or "tank's bane") was the popular name for the Raketenpanzerbüchse 54 ("Rocket Anti-armor Rifle Model 54", abbreviated to RPzB 54), an 88 mm reusable anti-tank rocket launcher developed by Nazi Germany in World War II. Another earlier, official name was Ofenrohr ("stove pipe").

The Panzerschreck was designed as a lightweight infantry anti-tank weapon and was an enlarged copy of the American bazooka. The weapon was shoulder-launched and fired a fin-stabilized rocket with a shaped-charge warhead. It was made in smaller numbers than the Panzerfaust, which was a light, disposable anti-tank weapon that used a system not unlike those of recoilless rifles.

History

The Panzerschreck development was initially based on the American "bazooka", captured during the Tunisian campaign, November 1942. The Panzerschreck was larger and heavier than its American counterpart – the Panzerschreck had an 88 mm calibre, compared to the 60 mm calibre of the bazooka – which meant that it could penetrate thicker armor, but also produced more smoke when firing.

Calibre 88 mm was selected as the existing RPzB. Gr. 4312 for 8.8 cm Raketenwerfer 43 was reused for Panzerschreck. Raketenwerfer 43 had percussion firing, whereas for the Panzerschreck an electrical priming was selected, forming standard grenade RPzB. Gr. 4322. Other munitions were developed, including drill dummy, practice live rocket with inert warhead and standard grenade with improved contact system.

Unlike the rockets used in American bazookas which extinguished before leaving the tube, the RPzB rockets kept burning for about  after exiting the tube. Users were instructed to wear heavy gloves, a protective poncho and a gas mask without a filter to protect them from the heat of the backblast when the weapon was fired. Improvised shields were made to protect the user and in February 1944, the RPzB 54 was fitted with an official blast shield to protect the operator which made the weapon heavier, weighing  empty. Small numbers of the shortened RPzB 54/1 were later produced.

Firing the RPzB generated copious amounts of smoke both in front of and behind the weapon. Because of the weapon's tube and smoke produced, official documentation named the weapon the Ofenrohr ("stove pipe"). This also meant that anti-tank teams were revealed once they fired, making them targets and, therefore, required them to shift positions after firing. This type of system also made it problematic to fire the weapon from inside closed spaces (such as bunkers or houses), filling the room with toxic smoke and revealing the firing location immediately.

Anti-tank teams were instructed to aim for the thinner side or rear armor whenever possible. Allied armored units frequently attempted to add improvised protection to their tanks, e.g., sandbags, spare track units, logs and so on to protect against HEAT rounds. Another defense was to rig metal mesh and netting around the tank, resembling the German Schürzen auxiliary plates. In practice about 1 meter of air gap were required to substantially reduce the penetrating capability of RPzB, thus skirts and sandbags were entirely ineffective against RPzB and Panzerfaust.

In 1944, Germany provided the Panzerschreck to Finland, which used it to great effect against Soviet armour. The Finnish name for the weapon was Panssarikauhu (literal translation of the German name).

The Italian Social Republic and Hungary also used the Panzerschreck. Several Italian units became known as skilled anti-tank hunters and the Hungarians used the Panzerschreck extensively during Operation Spring Awakening.

Performance
Penetration measured against Face-Hardened Armor (FHA), Rolled Homogeneous Armor (RHA).

Users

 
 
 
  Hungarian Government of National Unity
 
  Polish Home Army (captured weapons)
  (captured weapons)

See also
 Shoulder-fired missile
 List of common World War II infantry weapons
 List of World War II firearms of Germany
 PIAT
 Rocket-propelled grenade
 RPG-2

Notes

References

External links

 German 88mm "Panzerschrek"

Anti-tank rockets
Anti-tank weapons
World War II infantry weapons of Germany
Rocket launchers
Weapons and ammunition introduced in 1943